These are lists of 3D films:

 List of 3D films (2005–present)
 List of 3D films (1914–2004)

Lists of films by technology